Susanna Farm is a historic home located at Dawsonville, Montgomery County, Maryland, United States. It is an L-shaped, -story frame dwelling house. The last major change occurred when the house was doubled in size and value by Benjamin F. Dyson in 1877–78, who renovated it in the Italianate style. Five outbuildings stand on the property, including a stone kitchen/slave quarters and meat house which are believed to be contemporary with the house, an 1870s frame bank barn, and 20th century farm buildings.

The Susanna Farm was listed on the National Register of Historic Places in 1983.

References

External links
, including photo in 2003, at Maryland Historical Trust website

Houses on the National Register of Historic Places in Maryland
Houses in Montgomery County, Maryland
Italianate architecture in Maryland
National Register of Historic Places in Montgomery County, Maryland
Slave cabins and quarters in the United States